John Augustus Stone (December 15, 1801 – June 1, 1834) was an American actor, dramatist, and playwright, best known as the author of Metamora; or, The Last of the Wampanoags.

Biography
He appeared on the New York stage beginning in 1822.
He wrote Metamora, as a vehicle for Edwin Forrest, who offered as a prize $500 and half of the proceeds from the third night. William Cullen Bryant headed a committee which chose Stone's play as the best of 14 submitted. The play, first produced in 1829, told the life of King Philip.

He married Mrs. Amelia Greene Legge, an actress. She later married Nathaniel Harrington Bannister.

Stone suffered periods of insanity and he committed suicide by jumping into the Schuylkill River. He was buried at Machpelah Cemetery in Philadelphia. That cemetery was closed in 1895 and the bodies moved to North Mount Moriah Cemetery (AKA Graceland)in Yeadon PA, which is not affiliated with the nearby Mount Moriah Cemetery, which was later abandoned. His grave at Machpelah was marked by a monument erected by Forrest. The inscription reads: "Erected to the memory of the author of 'Metamora' by his friend, Edwin Forrest". Some sources cite Forrest's success with Stone's plays and his paltry remuneration as causing his suicide.

Works
In addition to Metamora, Stone wrote a number of other plays:
Montrano, or Who's the Traitor, 1822 Philadelphia 
Restoration, or the Diamond Cross, 1824 Chatham Garden Theater in New-York.
Tancred, or the Siege of Antioch 1827
La Roque; a Regicide Charleston
Fauntleroy; or, the Fatal Forgery Charleston
Touretoun 
Banker of Rouen
Tancred, King of Sicily March 16, 1831
The Demoniac, or the Prophet's Bride April 12, 1831 
The Ancient Briton, March 27, 1833 
The Knight of the Golden Fleece, or The Yankee in Spain, 1834
None of them enjoyed Metamora's success.

References

External links
 

1801 births
1834 deaths
People from Concord, Massachusetts
Suicides by drowning in the United States
Suicides in Philadelphia
19th-century American dramatists and playwrights
19th-century American male actors
Burials in Pennsylvania
1830s suicides